Steve Hartman may be:
 Steve Hartman
 Steve Hartman (sportscaster)